Chat Qayah (also Romanized as Chāt Qayah) is a village in Qeshlaq Rural District, Abish Ahmad District, Kaleybar County, East Azerbaijan Province, Iran. At the 2006 census, its population was 174, in 43 families.

References 

Populated places in Kaleybar County